Koźlice may refer to the following places, all in Lower Silesian Voivodeship in southwest Poland:
Koźlice, Lubin County in Gmina Rudna, Lubin County
Koźlice, Polkowice County in Gmina Gaworzyce, Polkowice County
Koźlice, Zgorzelec County in Gmina Zgorzelec, Zgorzelec County
Koźlice, Pomeranian Voivodeship (north Poland)